is a group of the Japan Air Self-Defense Force based at Komaki Air Base in Aichi Prefecture. It is sometimes referred to as the 1st Tactical Airlift Wing.

It consists of two squadrons:
 401st Tactical Airlift Squadron (Lockheed C-130H Hercules)
 404th Tactical Airlift Tanker Squadron (Boeing KC-767J)

References

Units of the Japan Air Self-Defense Force